Wait and See is a 1998 Japanese film directed by Shinji Sōmai.

References

External links

1998 films
Japanese drama films
1990s Japanese films